North Hamgyong Province (Hamgyŏngbukdo) is the northernmost province of North Korea. The province was formed in 1896 from the northern half of the former Hamgyong Province.

Geography
The province is bordered by China (Jilin) on the north, South Hamgyong on the southwest and Ryanggang on the west. On the east is the Sea of Japan. The province is home to the Musudan-ri rocket launching site and the Hoeryong concentration camp. In 2004, Rason was reabsorbed back into the province and since 2010, Rason is again a Directly Governed City.

Economy
In critical studies of North Korea, North Hamgyong has a reputation as a neglected and underdeveloped region even by the country's standards. It was where the 1990s famine hit hardest, and food shortages persist even in the 2020s. The majority of North Korean defectors who live in South Korea came from the province after crossing the relatively shallow Tumen River into China. Therefore the conditions of the province, which analyst Fyodor Tertitskiy has described as "not only a very grim, but also a very boring place," tend to be projected onto the whole country, even though they are not representative.

Administrative divisions
North Hamgyong is divided into three cities (si) and 12 counties (kun). These are further divided into villages (ri) in rural areas and dong (neighborhoods) in cities. Some cities are also divided into wards known as "kuyŏk", which are administered just below the city level.

Cities
 Chongjin (Capital)청진시/
 Hoeryong회령시/
 Kimchaek김책시/

Counties

See also

 Punggye-ri Nuclear Test Site
 2006 North Korean nuclear test
 Administrative divisions of North Korea

References
	

 
Provinces of North Korea